Ramchandra Saha Balika Vidyalaya is a girls' secondary school situated at Gazole of Malda district, in the state of West Bengal, India. The school was founded 21 January in the year of 2001. It was affiliated by the West Bengal Board of Secondary Education as well as West Bengal Council of Higher Secondary Education.

Location 
The school is situated at Nayapara, Gazole in Maldah district beside the National Highway no. 34. Nearest Railway station is Gazole Railway station.

See also
Education in India
List of schools in India
Education in West Bengal

References

External links
 School Website

High schools and secondary schools in West Bengal
Girls' schools in West Bengal
Schools in Malda district
Educational institutions established in 2001
2001 establishments in West Bengal